Cephonodes leucogaster is a moth of the family Sphingidae. It is known from Madagascar.

References

Cephonodes
Moths described in 1903
Moths of Madagascar
Moths of Africa